The Pleurobranchidae are a taxonomic family of sea slugs, marine gastropod molluscs in the clade Pleurobranchomorpha.

Characteristics 
Species in the family Pleurobranchidae have a prominent mantle and an internal shell that becomes reduced or is lost completely in adults. Some adult species have been seen feeding on ascidians. Larval pleurobranchids can be planktotrophic (feeding on plankton), lecithotrophic (deriving nutrition from yolk), or direct developing.

Like all Pleurobranchomorpha, they breathe through an external gill, located on the right side (contrary to nudibranchs who have it on the back), just after the genital organ. 

Many species produce secretions from their rich glandular mantle as a chemical defense against predators.
Even the production of sulfuric acid has been reported.

Taxonomy
Until 2005, this family was placed in the suborder Notaspidea. However, in the taxonomy of Bouchet & Rocroi (2005), the family Pleurobranchidae was placed in the superfamily Pleurobranchoidea, the only family belonging to the subclade Pleurobranchomorpha (sister to the subclade Nudibranchia), part of the clade Nudipleura.

Subfamily Pleurobranchinae
Bathyberthella
Bathyberthella antarctica  Willan and Bertsch, 1987 
Berthella de Blainville, 1824
Berthella africana  Pruvot-Fol, 1953 
Berthella agassizi MacFarland, 1909 
Berthella americana  A. E. Verrill, 1885 
Berthella aurantiaca  Risso, 1818 
Berthella caledonica  Dall, 1900  
Berthella californica  Dall, 1900  California sidegill slug
Berthella canariensis  Cervera, J.L., T.M. Gosliner, J.C. García-Gómez & J. Ortea, 2000 
Berthella elongata  Cantraine, 1835 
Berthella martensi  Pilsbry, 1896 
Berthella medietas  R. Burn, 1962 
Berthella ocellata delle Chiaje, 1830 
Berthella ornata  T.F. Cheeseman, 1878 
Berthella patagonica  d'Orbigny, 1837 
Berthella platei  Bergh, 1898 
Berthella plumula Montagu, 1803 
Berthella sideralis  Lovén, 1846 
Berthella stellata  Risso, 1826 
Berthella strongi  MacFarland, 1966 
Berthella tamiu  Ev. Marcus, 1984 
Berthella tupala  Er. Marcus, 1957 
Berthellina  Gardiner, 1936 
Berthellina amarillus  Mattox, 1953 
Berthellina americanus  Verrill, 1885 
Berthellina circularis  Mörch, 1863 
Berthellina citrina  Rüppell & Leuckart, 1828  (synonym of Gymnotoplax citrina Er. Marcus, 1957 )
Berthellina delicata  W.H. Pease, 1861 
Berthellina edwardsii Vayssière, 1897 
Berthellina engeli  Gardiner, 1936 
Berthellina granulata (Krauss, 1848)
Berthellina ilisima  Marcus, Er. & Ev. Marcus, 1967 
Berthellina quadridens  Mörch, 1863  (junior synonym of Gymnotoplax quadridens)
 Boreoberthella Martynov & Schrödl, 2009
Bouvieria  Vayssière, 1896 : synonym of Berthella Blainville, 1824
Bouvieria auriantiaca Risso, 1813 
Bouvieria ocellata  S. delle Chiaje, 1828 
Bouvieria perforata   Philippi, 1844 
Pleurehdera Ev. Marcus & Er. Marcus, 1970
Pleurehdera haraldi Ev. Marcus & Er. Marcus, 1970 
Pleurobranchus  Cuvier, 1805 
Tomthompsonia
Tomthompsonia antarctica  Thiele, 1912

References

External links

 Richard C. Willan, Description of a New Pleurobranch (Opisthobranchia, Notaspidea) from Antarctic with a review of Notaspideans from South Polar Seas; The Veliger 29 (3), 1987 p. 292-302

 
Taxa named by John Edward Gray